Jan Kriege (15 May 1884 – 3 August 1944) was a Dutch sculptor. His work was part of the sculpture event in the art competition at the 1928 Summer Olympics.

References

1884 births
1944 deaths
20th-century Dutch sculptors
Dutch male sculptors
Olympic competitors in art competitions
People from Woerden
20th-century Dutch male artists